Edmond Public Schools is a public school district located in the Oklahoma City suburb of Edmond, Oklahoma. The school district has an enrollment of 23,496 students as of October 2020, employing over 3,000 people. Edmond Public Schools consists of 17 elementary schools, six middle schools, and three high schools and an early childhood center. Two new elementary schools, Redbud Elementary and Scissortail Elementary, are opening in 2022.

In 2020, Bret Towne announced that he was retiring as superintendent at the end of the 2020–2021 school year.

History 
In 1889, Oklahoma's first public schoolhouse (not to be confused with Oklahoma's first school) was opened in Edmond. The project was funded by the Ladies School Aid Society, led by Jennie Forster. The first class of students attended school on September 16, 1889. Over the 1890s, the class size outgrew the original schoolhouse, which was sold in September 1899. Eventually, the status of the building was lost to time.

In 1997, the Edmond City Council approved an effort to investigate what happened to the schoolhouse. The Edmond Historic Preservation Trust led the investigation and eventual restoration of the schoolhouse was completed in April 2007.

Schools

References

School districts in Oklahoma
Education in Oklahoma County, Oklahoma
Edmond, Oklahoma